Network documentation is a form of technical documentation. It is the practice of maintaining records about networks of computers. The documentation is used to give administrators information about how the network should look, perform and where to troubleshoot problems as they occur.

Essential Parts of Network Documentation 
As the purpose of network documentation is to keep networks running as smoothly as possible while minimizing downtime when repairs are necessary, essential parts of network documentation include:

Map of the entire network to include locations of hardware and the cabling that connects the hardware
Server information such as data on the individual servers, schedules and locations of backups 
Software information such as current versions, dates, licensing and support
Vendor and contractor information
Service agreements 
Detailed record of problems and solutions: dated along with procedures and results

Notation that helps administrators remember key details are the basics of network documentation while visual representations assist in helping administrators understand how equipment and the notation relates to one another.

A basic network diagram includes hardware and shows how it is connected. Basic diagrams include  L1/L2 drawing of the physical connectivity and layout of the network.

Network Documentation Software 
Though network documentation can be done by hand, for larger organizations network documentation software is utilized. Software applications can include diagrams, inventory management and circuit and cable traces. Examples include Graphical Networks' netTerrain, Microsoft Visio, Docusnap, Gliffy, Opnet's Netmapper, XIA Configuration among others.

References

Computer network analysis
Technical communication